The 1971 GP Ouest-France was the 35th edition of the GP Ouest-France cycle race and was held on 24 August 1971. The race started and finished in Plouay. The race was won by Jean-Pierre Danguillaume.

General classification

References

1971
1971 in road cycling
1971 in French sport